UDC-TV is an educational access television station based in Washington, D.C., the federal capital of the United States. It is owned and operated by the University of the District of Columbia. UDC-TV can be viewed anywhere within the UDC's campus, as well as any home or facility with cable TV service within the District of Columbia, including all hotels, federal and Congressional offices, as well as the White House.

Programming
Locally produced programming from UDC-TV mainly focuses on health and family-related issues, as well as some locally produced educational programming. During the overnight hours and portions of the weekends, the station cablecasts programming from the Classic Arts Showcase.

References

External links
UDC-TV’s YouTube Channel
UDC-TV Webpage

American public access television
Mass media in Washington, D.C.
University of the District of Columbia
Student television stations in the United States